Seda is a town in Valmiera Municipality in the Vidzeme region of Latvia. It is founded in 1952. The major local industry is extraction of peat. The town is remarkable for its 1950s-style Stalinist architecture, dating from the glory days of Seda, when workers from all over the Soviet Union came to work for the peat extraction enterprise.

Joint stock company "Seda" is still a major employer.

The town and its people were the subject of the documentary film Seda: People of the Marsh (director Kaspars Goba; Latvia/Germany, 2004).

Gallery

See also
List of cities in Latvia

References

External links
 
 
 Website of JSC "Seda"

Towns in Latvia
Populated places established in 1952
1952 establishments in the Soviet Union
Valmiera Municipality
Kreis Walk
Vidzeme